State Highway 50 (Andhra Pradesh) is a state highway in the Indian state of Andhra Pradesh

Route 

It starts at Nandyal and passes through Giddaluru, Bestavaripeta and ends at Ongole.

See also 
 List of State Highways in Andhra Pradesh

References 

State Highways in Andhra Pradesh
Roads in Kurnool district
Roads in Prakasam district